South Side Park a.k.a. Southside Park was a baseball park in Winston-Salem, North Carolina. It was the home field of the Winston-Salem minor league ball clubs prior to the opening of Ernie Shore Field in 1956, which was constructed after fire destroyed the old wooden South Side venue.

The ballpark was bounded by Waughtown Street (east, right field) where Fayetteville Street T's into it; railroad tracks and South Main Street (west, third base); and the imaginary line of Vintage Street (south, first base). City directories gave the location as "southwest corner Waughtown and Fayetteville".

The earliest newspaper references indicate the park was in existence by 1894. It was used for various local baseball games and other events, before during and after the various professional baseball clubs called it home. It was initially called "South-Side Park" and then "Southside Athletic Park", before "Southside Park" became the standard nomenclature in local media.

After the fire, the land was redeveloped. The approximate footprint of the site is now occupied by the University of North Carolina School of the Arts.

External links
News story about Winston-Salem ballparks
Southside Park on Sanborn map, 1949

Defunct baseball venues in the United States
Baseball venues in North Carolina
Sports venues in Winston-Salem, North Carolina
1950s disestablishments in North Carolina